The lyrics of the anthem of the Community of Madrid are a poem written by Agustín García Calvo. The music is a work of composer Pablo Sorozábal Serrano. It is the official anthem of the Community of Madrid since 24 December 1983, when it was published in the official regional gazette.

The hymn was composed at the request of the Government of the Community of Madrid, founded in 1983. During the process of restructuration of the country's territorial organization it was decided the Province of Madrid became a single-province autonomous community. The first regional premier, Presidente de la Comunidad de Madrid, Joaquín Leguina, tasked philosopher Agustín García Calvo with the writing of the lyrics. The later accepted the challenge at the symbolic price of 1 peseta.

The lyrics sarcastically deal with the new administrative organization in Spain and with the very same existence of the Community of Madrid. Unlike the hyms of other autonomous communities, the Hymn of the Community of Madrid barely has institutional use, relegated to just some special events, such as the commemoration of the 2 May 1808 Uprising, the regional day.

Lyrics

References

External links 
 Law proclaiming the flag, coats of arms and hymn of the autonomous community of Madrid.

1983 in music
1983 in Spain
Community of Madrid
Spanish anthems